Opera Ball is a 1939 German musical comedy film directed by Géza von Bolváry and starring Heli Finkenzeller, Fita Benkhoff, and Marte Harell. An operetta film, it is based on the 1898 work of the same name composed by Richard Heuberger. In 1956 it was remade as Opera Ball in Austria with some of the same personnel.

The film's sets were designed by the art director Robert Herlth. Erna Berger provided a singing voice.

Main cast

References

Bibliography

External links 
 

1939 films
1939 musical comedy films
German musical comedy films
Films of Nazi Germany
1930s German-language films
Films directed by Géza von Bolváry
Operetta films
Terra Film films
German black-and-white films
1930s German films